Misty Blowers is the Chief Technology Officer of the US Marine Corps, an American computer scientist and professor of blockchain technologies at George Mason University. She was awarded the 2018 Early Achievement Award from SPIE.

Early life and education 
Blowers attended Oneida High School in Oneida County, New York. She attended State University of New York College of Environmental Science and Forestry, where she earned a Bachelors degree in Paper Science in 1995. After graduating she spent six years working at Chemical Process Equipment Suppliers designing new pulp mill systems. Blowers completed a Masters in Computer Science at Syracuse University in 2003. She obtained her doctorate in Applied Science and Engineering at the State University of New York College of Environmental Science and Forestry in 2009.

Career 
Blowers began to work for the Air Force Research Laboratory. She managed Cyber Operations and looked after over $175 million government contracts. Blowers has several patents for detection and tracking. She designed and developed a machine learning-based approach to monitor complex systems in real time and provide actionable alerts. In 2014 she was named "Technologist of the Year" by the Technical Association of Central New York, and is the only woman ever to win the prize.

She, along with a group of high school children, wrote the book Evolution of Cyber Operations and Technologies to 2035 in 2015. She founded Datalytica LLC in 2015. Blowers is involved with the development of programs for the US Department of Defense. She is an adjunct professor in Blockchain Technologies at George Mason University. Blowers was corporate director of strategic development at Peraton and performs similar work several other companies.

She was awarded the 2018 Early Achievement Award from SPIE. She was appointed to a NATO task force on Mission Assurance of Autonomous Unmanned Systems.

References 

Living people
Computer scientists
American computer scientists
Syracuse University alumni
State University of New York College of Environmental Science and Forestry alumni
Year of birth missing (living people)
21st-century American scientists
21st-century American women scientists
George Mason University faculty
American women academics